Gérard Badini (born April 16, 1931, Paris, France), known as Mr. Swing, is a French jazz bandleader, composer, reedist, and pianist.

Badini's father was an opera singer. Badini began playing professionally in the early 1950s, playing clarinet in New Orleans jazz-style ensembles with Michel Attenoux, Jimmy Archey, Lil Armstrong, Sidney Bechet, Bill Coleman, and Peanuts Holland. In 1955, he joined Claude Bolling's ensemble and then joined Bolling on a worldwide tour as members of Jack Diéval's orchestra. He switched principally to tenor sax beginning in 1958, continuing to work with Bolland as well as Roger Guérin and Geo Daly in the late 1950s. In the 1960s he worked with Alice Babs, Duke Ellington, Jean-Claude Naude, Cat Anderson, Paul Gonsalves, Jef Gilson, and François Guin.

He founded his own group, Swing Machine, in 1973, working in this group with Bobby Durham, Raymond Fol, Michel Gaudry, Helen Humes, Sonny Payne, and Sam Woodyard. From 1977 to 1979, Badini lived in New York City, performing there with Roy Eldridge, Major Holley, Oliver Jackson, Dick Katz, Clark Terry, Gerald Wiggins, and Reggie Workman. In 1984, he formed a new big-band ensemble, Super Swing Machine, which he led and played piano in through the late 1990s.

References

André Clergeat and Barry Kernfeld, "Gérard Badini". The New Grove Dictionary of Jazz, 2nd edition.

French jazz pianists
20th-century French male pianists
French jazz clarinetists
French jazz saxophonists
Male saxophonists
Musicians from Paris
French male conductors (music)
1931 births
Living people
20th-century saxophonists
20th-century French conductors (music)
20th-century clarinetists
French male jazz musicians
Black & Blue Records artists